Pick Everard is a UK based multi-disciplinary consultancy, operating primarily in the built environment. They offer services including Architecture, BIM services, Building services engineering, Civil engineering, Cost and commercial management, Environmental services, Health and safety services, Interior design, Landscape architecture, Management consultancy, Project and programme management, Property and asset advisory, Structural engineering, Sustainability and energy and Water engineering.

The company was founded in 1866 as an engineering and architectural practice and have grown over 150 years to become a national practice with over 600 employees and 15 offices located throughout the UK including the head office in Leicester and further offices including Glasgow, London, Cardiff and Manchester, enabling Pick Everard to deliver multi-disciplinary services on a national basis.

History 
Pick Everard was founded by John Breedon Everard, a civil engineer  in 1866 at 6 Millstone Lane, Leicester. Samuel Perkins Pick, an architect joined John Breedon Everard as his assistant in 1882 and as a partner in 1888.

John Breedon Everard was the son of Breedon Everard, the joint founder of quarrying and mining business Ellis and Everard Ltd (later Aggregate Industries). He was the nephew of the brewer William Everard and in 1875 he designed a new tower brewery for Everards Brewery at Southgate St, Leicester.

At the beginning of the 20th century, Bernard Everard (son of John Breedon Everard) became a partner of the firm, which changed its name to Everard, Son and Pick. William Keay, a civil engineer who worked for Everard, Son and Pick became a partner circa 1920 and in 1925, Martin Gimson, a civil engineer became the fourth partner, changing the firm's name to Pick, Everard, Keay and Gimson. The company today is called Pick Everard.

Services 
Advisory Services; Architecture; BIM Consultants; Building Surveyors; Building Services Engineers; Civil Engineers; Cost Consultants and Quantity Surveyors; Environmental Consultants; Facilities Management Consultants; Health and Safety Consultancy Services; Interior Designers; Landscape Architects; Project Managers; Structural Engineers; Sustainability and Energy Consultants; Water Engineers.

Office locations 
Birmingham; Bristol City; Bristol Bradley Stoke; Bury St Edmunds; Cardiff; Derby; Edinburgh; Glasgow; Inverness; Leeds; Leicester; London; Manchester; Nottingham; Sheffield.

Awards and recognition 

 RICS Social Impact Awards: Education Award 2020 East
  Association of Consulting Engineers (ACE) Awards: Best UK Business Performance (Large Organisation) Award 2019
 Celebrating Construction Awards: Integration and Collaborative Working Award 2019 and Value Award 2019
 NEC Awards: Client of the Year – Highly Commended 2019
 SPACES Awards: Young Visionary Awards – Highly Commended x 2 2019

References  

Construction and civil engineering companies of the United Kingdom
Engineering consulting firms of the United Kingdom
British companies established in 1866
Companies based in Leicester
1866 establishments in England
Construction and civil engineering companies established in 1866